Lady Joan Holland (1350 – October 1384) was Duchess of Brittany as the second wife of John IV, Duke of Brittany. She was the daughter of Joan of Kent and Thomas Holland, 1st Earl of Kent. Her mother's second husband was Edward the Black Prince, and the child of that marriage was King Richard II of England.

Joan Holland's marriage to John IV took place in London in May 1366, but without the approval of King Edward III of England, Joan's step-grandfather, who claimed overlordship of Brittany. The couple had no children.

Joan's death, in her thirties, was politically inexpedient. In 1386, two years afterwards, John IV married Joan of Navarre, later the queen of King Henry IV of England.

References

1350 births
1384 deaths
Daughters of British earls
Duchesses of Brittany
Joan
Joan
Wives of knights
14th-century English women
14th-century English people
14th-century Breton women